Osbert Richard Frederick (born in All Saints, Antigua and Barbuda) is an Antiguan and Barbudan politician. He was appointed senator by Prime Minister Gaston Browne. After his appointment, he was elected the Deputy senate president in the Upper House of Parliament in Antigua and Barbuda.

Early life and education 
Osbert Richard Frederick was born in All Saints, Antigua and Barbuda. He attended the Antigua Seventh Day Adventist School where he completed his secondary school education. After his secondary education he attended University of the Virgin Islands in 1988 where he obtained his BSc and MSc in Tourism and Hospitality Management.

Career 
Frederick lost his first election when he contested the All Saints East and St. Luke East seat for the Antigua Labour Party in the 2009 general election of Antigua and Barbuda, losing to Chester Hughes of the United Progressive Party. He was appointed senator in 2014 by prime minister Gaston Browne during the 2014 general elections of Antigua and Barbuda.

During the first sitting of the Upper House of Parliament in Antigua and Barbuda he was appointed deputy senate president. In 2018, he was re-appointed as senator.

See also 

 Senate (Antigua and Barbuda)

References 

Antigua and Barbuda politicians
University of the Virgin Islands alumni
Antigua and Barbuda Labour Party politicians
Living people
Members of the Senate (Antigua and Barbuda)
Year of birth missing (living people)